John Richardson (April 5, 1843 – August 26, 1915) was an Ontario farmer and political figure. He represented York East in the Legislative Assembly of Ontario from 1894 to 1904 as a Liberal member.

He was born in Scarborough, Canada West and was educated at Victoria College in Cobourg. Richardson served on the township council for Scarborough from 1876 to 1894, serving as reeve from 1881 to 1894, and also served as warden for York County.

He died in 1915.

References 

 A History of Scarborough, ed. Robert R. Bonis (1965)

External links 
The Canadian parliamentary companion, 1897 JA Gemmill
 

1844 births
1915 deaths
Ontario Liberal Party MPPs
People from Scarborough, Toronto